Arrowhead, also known as Arrowhead at Red Hill, is a historic home and farm complex located near Charlottesville, Albemarle County, Virginia. It consists of a two-story, three-bay, gable-roofed frame center section dated to the 1850s; a two-story, multi-bay north extension added in the early 1900s; and a  two-bay, two-story library wing added about 1907–1908. The interior features Greek Revival style details. Also on the property are a one-story frame kitchen building, a brick smokehouse, a large icehouse (now a garage), and a -story board-and-batten cottage.

It was added to the National Register of Historic Places in 1991.

References

Houses on the National Register of Historic Places in Virginia
Greek Revival houses in Virginia
Houses completed in 1860
Houses in Albemarle County, Virginia
National Register of Historic Places in Albemarle County, Virginia
U.S. Route 29